Santiago Giraldo was the defending champion, but chose to play in the Shenzhen Open instead.

Víctor Estrella Burgos won the title, defeating João Souza 7–6(7–5), 3–6, 7–6(8–6) in the final.

Seeds

Draw

Finals

Top half

Bottom half

References
 Main Draw
 Qualifying Draw

Seguros Bolivar Open- Singles
2014 Singles